Patrick Vallençant (9 June 1946 in Lyon – 28 March 1989) was a French alpinist/skier and pioneer in ski mountaineering.

He was a pioneer in ski mountaineering and leader of the French school of ski mountaineers. His motto was: "si tu tombes, tu meurs", translated as "you fall, you die". In addition to numerous first descents, he was responsible for the creation of the "Pedal-Jump Turn" and co-founded the Degré 7 ski apparel company.

He died on 28 March 1989, in a non-skiing related climbing accident as a result of a broken carabiner, while abseiling from the top of La Beaume Rouge, in France.

Skiing 
Vallençant became known for a number of first descents on skis within the French Alps that had previously been considered too steep to ski. To achieve this he developed a ski technique known as the "Pedal-Jump Turn".  His feats required him to first climb the mountain in order to make the descent on skis, at the time it was uncommon to use helicopters to reach the top. His climbing and skiing partner for many of these first descents was Anselme Baud. In achieving this he took up the mantel of Sylvain Saudan ("Le Skieur de l'Impossible") (French Wiki, Sylvain Saudan) and was a contemporary of other French extreme skiers, such as Jean-Marc Boivin and Bruno Gouvy.

Pedal-Jump Turn 
To cope with skiing the steep terrain (greater than 50 degrees), Vallençant developed a new turning technique, known as the "Pedal-Jump Turn" (also "Pedal Hop Turn" and "Pedal Step Turn"). The technique involved pushing off from the uphill ski, away from the slope and completing a portion of turn's rotation while in the air and then landing back on the downhill ski.  With the advent of parabolic skis, using the uphill ski to initiate a turn is now a common technique for carved turns and racing. The key difference is in carving or racing the skier is traveling much faster, the terrain is not as steep and there is no need for such a dramatic thrust off the slope. The "Pedal-Jump Turn" was originally developed on traditional racing skis.

Professional 
Patrick Vallençant founded the Stages Vallençant in Chamonix to teach extreme skiing & co-founded the "Degré 7" ski apparel company in 1983 with Iingrid Buchner, a stylist. He sold his share in Degré 7 in 1988.

References 

Ski Magazine (October 1980) – Patrick Vallencant and His Pedal-Jump Turn 
Climbing Magazine – No. 106 – Vallencant Cover Photo by Noble  
Ski Extreme, Ma Plenitude by Patrick Vallencant (Edité par Flammarion, 1992) (French Only, Ski Extreme, My Fullness)
PisteHors.com – Biography of Patrick Vallencant

External links 
Degré 7 – Skiing Apparel co-founded by Patrick Vallencant
Chris Noble – Photographed the Founders of Extreming Skiing 
Climbing Magazine Issue no. 106 – Patrick Vallencant skiing Pas de Chevre, above Chamonix (Photo by Chris Noble) 

Snow News 2003 – "Mountain Mavericks: Patrick Vallencant" 
Steep, Without Risk There Is No Adventure – A history of big mountain skiing, includes archival footage of Vallencant

1946 births
1989 deaths
Extreme skiers
French male ski mountaineers
Sportspeople from Lyon